Koregaon Park (earlier Koregaon Road Estate) is an area located in Pune, in the state of Maharashtra in India. It is primarily a posh residential area with lush greenery, but of late has been growing into a commercial hub as well. Koregaon Park also has a trendy dining and nightlife hub, with sleek European and Indian restaurants, plus live music bars, buzzy pubs and trendy cafe. It is also a destination for art and music enthusiasts in the city with many art galleries and clubs in the vicinity.

History

Earlier Ahmednagar road (simply Nagar road) was known as Koregaon road, since Koregaon Bhima village also falls on this road. Koregaon Bhima village was the site of a major battle between British East India Company and Peshwas in 1818.

In early 1920s, British settled a neighbourhood on the lands of Ghorpuri village, which was just outside of Pune. This neighbourhood was named Koregaon Road Estate, since this was in proximity to then Koregaon road (today's Ahmednagar road). The estate was divided into various numbers of plots, many of which were auctioned and purchased mostly by rich merchants or princely/royal families of India. Some specific plots were also kept reserved for the Military and Postal Department. This caused Koregaon Road to become one of the most up-market area in Pune which continues till today.

Later, when the road was renamed to Ahmednagar road, the neighbourhood was also renamed to Koregaon Park to avoid confusion with older road name as well as the Koregaon Bhima village.

Roads 

Koregaon Park has two major roads: North Main Road (lies in the north of Koregaon Park) which runs in parallel to South Main Road (lies in the south of Koregaon Park). Numerous link roads connect these two major roads. 

The lanes of Koregaon park with old British era bungalows and huge green trees on both sides attracts lots of people who visit here for morning/evening walks as well as just for hanging out.

Koregaon Park is connected with Yerawada, via the Bund Garden bridge and to Kalyani Nagar, via the Aga Khan Bridge. It also connected to Pune Camp and Magarpatta.

Dine 

The lanes numbered 6 and 7 has many pubs which adds vibes to the city's nightlife and attracts lots of youngsters. There are many food joints around which makes it a favorite outing destination.

The Westin and the Conrad hotels are located in Koregaon Park. Other major hotels are The O Hotel and Blue Diamond by Taj Hotels. German Bakery, a restaurant, is located in Koregaon Park.

Osho International Meditation Resort 

The Osho International Meditation Resort, which earlier was Osho Ashram, still attracts many visitors from abroad as well as natives who come here for meditation programs. The Osho Teerth Park, on the D. H. Dhunjibhoy Road, between lane 2 and 3, is a park made along a sewage, beautified with statues, bamboos, exotic plants, ferns, flowers etc. is another place where people come for picnics and spending time.

Chabad house
A Jewish Chabad house is located in Koregaon Park.

Schools and colleges
The Poona School and Home for Blind is located on North Main Road. The Sant Gadge Maharaj School is located on South Main Road.
The Saint Mira's Women's College is located on a link road, Pujya Kasturba Gandhi English and Marathi Medium School on North Main Road

2010 Pune bombing

On 13 February 2010, a terrorist attack took place in the neighbourhood when the German Bakery was bombed, killing 18.

References 

Neighbourhoods in Pune